GXP may refer to:
 GxP a generalization of quality guidelines
 Great Plains Energy, an American utility holding company
 Tenchi Muyo! GXP, an anime
 Giga-X-Pipe, a standard of bottom bracket on bicycles